Tan Sri Dr. Palan is a social entrepreneur, educator and author. He currently serves as the Pro-Chancellor of the University of Cyberjaya. The chairman of SMRT Holdings and the managing director of Minda Global Berhad, Dr. Palan founded Yayasan Palan (Palan Foundation), a charitable and educational non-profit foundation based in Malaysia. He is a Director on the Board of University Malaya.

Early life and education

Palan grew up in Melaka, Malaysia. He schooled at the St. Francis Institution. From the Nagrathar community with origins from Tamil Nadu, India, his father was a rubber planter.

In 1974, Palan enrolled in the University of Madras, where he pursued a bachelor's degree in Chemistry and then a Master's degree in Arts (Medical and Psychiatric Social Work) Madras School of Social Work graduating in 1979. Subsequently, he completed his MSc (Psychology) with the University of Leicester, United Kingdom. He completed his Advanced Management Programme with the Harvard Business School, USA. He also completed his PhD (Education) with Federation University, Ballarat, Victoria, Australia.

Career
Palan started his career as a Training and Human Resources Specialist. He founded the SMR Group which he took public in 2006. The company's principal services were Education, Human Resources Services and HR Technology. The company was listed on the ACE market of Bursa Malaysia Securities Berhad.

In 2015, Dr. Palan co-founded The Palan Foundation with his family, a non-profit organization based in Malaysia to support educational scholarships. He was appointed as the pro-chancellor of the University of Cyberjaya, the same year. In 2018,  Palan was appointed as the group managing director of Minda Global Berhad, a company engaged in education and listed on the Main Board of Bursa Malaysia Securities Berhad.

Bibliography
Reflections on an Entrepreneur
The Global Journey of an Asian 
Competency Management: a practitioner's guide
Tips on Competency Management 
Performance Management & Measurement: The Asian Context 
The Magic of Making Training Fun! 
Tips on Making Training FUN! 
Tips on High Impact Training
Creative Training Tips
Frame Jokes for Trainers 
Frequently asked questions in HRD
101 Questions in Training (Co-authored) 
Games Trainers Play (Co-authored) 
Creating Your Own Rainbow 
Tips on Creating Your Own Rainbow 
People Development in Sarawak: The Journey of Taib Mahmud

Awards
Dr. Palan is the recipient of the Darjah Kebesaran Panglima Setia Mahkota (PSM), which carries the honorary title "Tan Sri”,  DPMP award, which carries the title "Dato", and the Johan Bintang Kenyalang (JBK) award amongst other awards from several global organizations.

References

External links
 Official Website

Malaysian educators
Federation University Australia alumni
Alumni of the University of Leicester
University of Madras alumni
Year of birth missing (living people)
Living people